Scolopendridae (or, in older documents, Scolopendridæ) is a family of large centipedes (class Chilopoda). Nearly all species in this family have four ocelli (simple eyes) on each side of the head and only 21 pairs of legs, but there are exceptions: two scolopendrid species feature more legs (Scolopendropsis bahiensis, with 21 or 23 leg pairs, and S. duplicata, with 39 or 43 leg pairs), and some scolopendrid species are eyeless and blind (e.g., Cormocephalus sagmus, C. pyropygus, and C. delta). Three Asian members of this family, Scolopendra cataracta, Scolopendra paradoxa, and Scolopendra alcyona, are known to show amphibious behaviour. Two other species, Scolopendra hardwickei and Hemiscolopendra marginata, are known to show sexual dimorphism in the composition of their venom.

Genera

Subfamily Otostigminae (Kraepelin, 1903)

Tribe Otostigmini (Kraeplin, 1903) 
 Alipes Imhoff, 1854 
 Alluropus Silvestri, 1911
 Digitipes Attems, 1930
 Edentistoma Tömösváry,1882
 Ethmostigmus Pocock, 1898
 Otostigmus Porat, 1876
 Rhysida Wood, 1862

Tribe Sterropristini (Verhoeff, 1937)  
 Sterropristes Attems, 1934

Subfamily Scolopendrinae (Leach, 1814) 

 Arthrorhabdus Pocock, 1891 (= Arthrorhabdinus)
 
 Asanada Meinert, 1885 (= Pseudocryptops)

 Asanadopsis  Würmli, 1972

 Campylostigmus Ribaut, 1923

 Notiasemus Koch, 1985 

 
 Procrytops Piton, 1940

 Psiloscolopendra Kraepelin, 1903

 Rhoda Meinert, 1886 (= Pithopus)

 Scolopendra Linnaeus, 1758
 Scolopendropsis Brandt, 1841 
 
 Tonkinodentus Schileyko, 1992

The earliest record of this family is †Cratoraricrus, an extinct genus from the Early Cretaceous of the Crato Formation of Brazil.

References

External links 

 http://chilobase.biologia.unipd.it

thumb
ZAMN



 
Centipede families